Seze may be,

Seze language
Aurélien de Sèze
Raymond Desèze